Cedar Grove is an unincorporated community in Van Buren County, Tennessee, United States.

References

Unincorporated communities in Van Buren County, Tennessee
Unincorporated communities in Tennessee